Monegasque National Union (UNM) is a Monegasque political list. It ran in the 2023 election, winning all seats in the National Council. The list consists of three parties: Priorité Monaco, Horizon Monaco and Monegasque Union, and is currently led by Brigitte Boccone-Pagès.

History 
The list was founded on 17 October 2022 and included 23 members of the National Council out of 24 at the time.

On 15 November 2022, the list presented its candidates for the 2023 election.

Electoral history

National Council elections

References 

Political parties established in 2022
Monegasque nationalism
Monarchist parties in Monaco